Walls is the debut studio album by English singer and songwriter Louis Tomlinson, released on 31 January 2020 through Syco Music and Arista Records. It has spawned five singles: "Two of Us", "Kill My Mind", "We Made It", "Don't Let It Break Your Heart" and "Walls". The album was met with mixed reviews, but was moderately successful commercially. It sold 35,000 copies upon its release. The album debuted at number one in Argentina, Portugal, Mexico and Scotland. It reached the top ten in Australia, Austria, Belgium, Canada, Poland, Spain, and the UK, and also debuted and peaked at number nine on the US Billboard 200 chart.

Background
In making the album, Tomlinson stated he had spent "so long on this album" as he "couldn't help but crave a 'hit' single" after a career of "straight down the middle pop". While he started his solo career with the electro-influenced singles "Just Hold On" and "Back to You", after the deaths of both his mother and sister and reflecting on what he wanted, Tomlinson decided that "maybe I should start with what I love and work from there". After finally finding his sound, he managed to come up with an honest album of his thoughts and feelings and release it.

In an interview with Billboard, Tomlinson said that the album is him "just wearing [his] heart on his sleeve, and being honest, reflecting on a breakup", and that "once fans have heard the album, they will see a slightly different side" of him.

Tomlinson announced the album in a video posted to social media, saying he was "really relieved to finally be here" and thanking fans for their patience.

Music and themes
In an interview with Far Out Magazine Tomlinson stated that his album was influenced by such indie rock and britpop bands as Oasis and Arctic Monkeys that he grew up listening to. Lyrically Tomlinson took his inspiration from acts like Alex Turner, Amy Winehouse, Mike Skinner and Sam Fender. The themes of the album range from relationships and family to the folly of Tomlinson's youth and days of self-doubt, go back to his 1D days, recall relationship ups and downs and relate the life lessons learnt on the way to his present life.

The album opens with an indie pop, Britpop track "Kill My Mind", a song written as a "statement of intent. 'This is where I want to be, this is the space I want to move into.'" Guitar-based "Don't Let It Break Your Heart" is "a touching anthem about moving forward in the face of hardship" with "a surging, singalong chorus about losing someone, or perhaps the break-up of a relationship". "Two of Us" is a balladic ode to Tomlinson's late mother Johannah Deakin and the impact her death had on him. "Britpop-tinged" "We Made It" with a strummed acoustic guitar intro describes Tomlinson' pre-fame days, hanging out with his on-and-off girlfriend during his time in One Direction and their teen dreams for the future, while the chorus of the song references Tomlinson's fans and his struggle to find his place in the early days of One Direction. Acoustic guitar driven ballad "Too Young" as well as Oasis-inspired title track "Walls" are written about Tomlinson's temporary breakup with his girlfriend "that ultimately made the pair's relationship stronger." Tomlinson described "Too Young" as the song "about meeting 'the one' aged 18 and, like a lot of blokes that age, not being equipped for it. I found it hard to look that far ahead. I had to make a few mistakes and go down the wrong path to realise what I had and what I thought I’d lost." Tomlinson called "Walls" "more specific" and a song "about coming home having been on tour, soon after we'd split. I found some of my girlfriend’s clothes in the cupboard and it hit me what I’d done." He said that he loves "the indie sound of the song and its circular nature – it opens and closes with the same lyric."

An indie-pop "Habit" is "a message to fans" and "a reflection on fame" steeped in "gorgeous electric guitar", "crashing drums and sweeping strings." Tomlinson said that "music is the habit that I keep coming back to" and called the song "a thank you to fans and a reminder to [himself] to be grateful for being given this position." "Always You" is the oldest song on the album, teased by Tomlinson in early 2017 with cryptic posts on Twitter and Instagram In August 2017 Tomlinson posted the first 13 seconds of the track that contained the lyrics "I went to Amsterdam without you, and all I could do was think about you" on his Instagram story. Tomlinson said it was "kind of about my story of traveling the world and just being a f*****g idiot and going, 'Of course it was always you'." On an dramatic indie pop ballad "Fearless", which opens and closes with children's voices, Tomlinson looks back at the peers he grew up with and ponders what ageing means. "Perfect Now", "written quite deliberately as an attempt to write a fan favourite song" and "lyrically an extension of 'What Makes You Beautiful', One Direction's first single", features briskly-plucked acoustic guitar and violins. On "Defenceless" Tomlinson shows his honesty and vulnerability, "feeling great, youthful and amazing one day" and "a little bit down in the dumps the next day." The album closes with an indie guitar-driven Oasis-inspired "Only the Brave". Tomlinson described the track as the one "that may have been written for Liam Gallagher", and that despite it being the shortest track on the album (1.44 minutes), it "gets its message across so clearly."

Critical reception

Walls was met with mixed reviews. At Metacritic, which assigns a normalised rating out of 100 to reviews from professional critics, the album has an average score of 53 out of 100, based on six reviews, indicating "mixed or average reviews". Aggregator AnyDecentMusic? gave it 5.4 out of 10, based on their assessment of the critical consensus.

Rob Sheffield of Rolling Stone called Tomlinson's album '"excellent" and "worth the wait" and praised him for "putting a lot of heart and soul into it". He particularly singled out "Two of Us", calling it "emotionally bold" and saying that "these days people aren’t necessarily used to hearing male songwriters open their hearts like that"; and "Kill My Mind" - "the sound of a pop artist hitting a new creative breakthrough." Neil Yeung of AllMusic was similarly positive, calling the album's tracks a "pleasantly surprising [and] straightforward collection of indie and Britpop-influenced singalongs from a maturing family man", "wholesome and sweet as any of 1D's hit singles" and praised Tomlinson's "genuinely heartwarming and enjoyable authenticity". He ended his review by saying that Tomlinson's album "winds up being the most mature and natural of the ex-1D bunch". Mike Nied of Idolator called the album "a strong debut", "a compelling collection that boldly defies current trends and simultaneously proves [Tomlinson] has more to say now than ever before" and "a serious win that will keep us coming back for more". Jeffrey Davies of Spectrum Culture called Walls "an introspective look at growing up and finding yourself—and your voice" and praised Tomlinson for "addressing some more mature subjects on Walls, such as anxiety, mortality, and self-integrity, which also sets the album apart from the solo work of other ex-1D members". The Aquarian Weekly called Walls "a personal, cleverly crafted approach to a bubblegum pop meets alternative rock debut album" and named it one of their 25 best albums of 2020, praising Tomlinson’s "expert storytelling abilities", "technical skills" and "instrument expertise".

Ella Kemp of NME described the album as "Oasis-inspired", "largely conservative" and "primarily guitar-led", particularly praising its opening track "Kill My Mind" (which she called "the album's best track") and "Walls". She ended the review by saying that Tomlinson's "perhaps taking the time to find himself properly before launching into a boisterous future". In her review for Entertainment.ie, Lauren Murphy specifically praised "Kill My Mind,"  "Too Young,"  "Habit," "Fearless," and "Perfect Now," but ended her review by stating that Tomlinson's debut solo album "embraces his love of indie music but doesn't quite go far enough" and takes "zero risks in a musical sense" though it has "some really tender moments that undoubtedly show his flair for lyric-writing." Nicholas Hautman of Us Weekly felt the record "fully embraces the Britpop genre" and called him "arguably the strongest songwriter" when compared to other One Direction members. He specifically complimented "We Made It" and "Only the Brave" as standout tracks while looking down on "Walls", which he called "bland for a title track", and "Always You", which he felt "tries a little too hard to replicate 1D’s famously euphoric choruses". Writing for the South China Morning Post, Chris Gillett felt the album was "a mixed bag" and that "he's still trying to find his own identity" but that he "shows signs of promise".

Some reviews were less positive. Alexandra Pollard of The Independent called the album "deeply unremarkable" while adding that "listening to it is like wading through a quagmire of banality". Mark Kennedy, writing for Associated Press, wrote that the album was "a total snoozer" while calling it "unoffensive and uneventful". Brenna Echrlich of Rolling Stone felt that the album was too nostalgic of Tomlinson's days in One Direction and that it "doesn’t quite assert enough musical independence" while hoping that in the future "he has the guts to let go and realize that those salad days are getting a bit wilted". Rachel McGrath of Evening Standard echoed Echrlich's thoughts, writing that "while Tomlinson attempts to embrace a slightly edgier sound, he often falls back on what worked for 1D" and that he "hasn’t quite shaken off his boyband past". Lior Phillips of Variety felt like Tomlinson didn't "try to recapture that group's past [One Direction] glories but tries recapturing Oasis's and Britpop's instead, keeping his real identity a blur" and that "it’s not yet clear exactly who Tomlinson is without them". Chris DeVille of Stereogum felt that the album "stops short of a full-blown Britpop revival" and called the album "extremely mid" and "basic". He ended his review by wondering "what an interesting record he could make if he let himself do so rather than remaining in the safety of One Direction’s shadow." Ashley Bardhan of Pitchfork gave a negative review, calling it "maddeningly uninteresting" and filled with "dead-eyed vocal delivery and lazy drumming, strumming, and writing," adding that she felt it was difficult to tell "whether Tomlinson is even trying to make music different from his time in One Direction," ending her review by saying "you can take the boy out of the boyband, but not the boyband out of the boy."

Commercial performance 
Walls debuted at number nine on the US Billboard 200 with 39,000 album-equivalent units, making it the first new album for Arista Records in almost nine years to hit the top 10 on the chart. At release, the album sold 35,000 units. In the UK, the album sold 49,027 units.

Track listing
The full track list for the album was revealed on 11 January 2020 through a mural painting on 83, Hanbury Street, London.

Personnel
Credits adapted from the album's liner notes.

Vocals

 Louis Tomlinson – lead vocals , background vocals 
 Wrabel – backing vocals, gang vocals 
 Andrew Jackson – backing vocals 
 Julian Bunetta – backing vocals 

 John Ryan II – backing vocals 
 John Mitchell – backing vocals 
 Jamie Hartman – backing vocals 
 Joe Janiak – backing vocals 

Musicians

 John Foyle – synths , bass guitar , acoustic guitar , electric guitar , drums 
 Sean Hurley – bass 
 Josh Tucker – bass guitar 
 Nicholas Semrad – keyboards 
 Jack Duxbury – electric guitar 
 Duck Blackwell – piano 
 Julian Bunetta – guitar, bass, keys, programming 
 Danny Majic – bass, keyboards, strings 
 Justin Franks – piano, keyboards, strings 
 Dan Kalisher – guitar 
 Blair Sinta – drums 

 Paul Sayer – guitar 
 Tom Longworth – bass 
 Karl Brazil – drums 
 Julius Bogren – guitar 
 Tony Malm – bass 
 Jamie Scott – guitar, tambourine 
 Mattias Johansson – violin 
 David Bukovinszky – cello 
 Joe Janiak – bass & acoustic guitar, electric guitar, percussion 
 Carey Watkins – drums 

Production

 Rob Bisel – engineering 
 Stuart Crichton – engineering 
 Mark Crew – engineering 
 Julian Bunetta – engineering 
 John Ryan II – engineering 
 Jeff Gunnell – engineering 
 Danny Majic – engineering 

 Martin Hannah – engineering 
 Dan Grech-Marguerat – mixing 
 Spike Stent – mixing 
 John Foyle – mixing 
 Matty Green – mixing 
 Duck Blackwell – engineering, mixing 
 Dale Becker – mastering 

Imagery
 Dulcie Boote – design
 Joeseth Carter – booklet photography
 Ryan Saradjola – cover photography

Charts

Weekly charts

Year-end charts

Certifications

Release history

See also
List of 2020 albums

References

2020 debut albums
Britpop albums
Louis Tomlinson albums
Albums produced by Andrew Watt (record producer)
Arista Records albums
Albums produced by Johan Carlsson